This article serves as an index - as complete as possible - of all the honorific orders or similar decorations received by the governors of Malacca, classified by continent, awarding country and recipient.

Various honours and titles have been received from time to time by the Governor of Malacca, one of the thirteen states of Malaysia. The governor bears the title of Yang di-Pertua Negeri, and is appointed to a four-year term by the Malaysian head of state.

State of Malacca 

Syed Zahiruddin Syed Hassan (4th Yang di-Pertua Negeri of Malacca 25 May 1975 – 30 November 1984) 
 Founding Grand Master of the Premier and Exalted Order of Malacca (1978 – 30 November 1984)
 Founding Grand Master of the Exalted Order of Malacca (1978 – 30 November 1984)
late Syed Ahmad Syed Mahmud Shahabuddin (5th Yang di-Pertua Negeri of Malacca 4 December 1984 – 3 June 2004) 
 Grand Master and Grand Commander of the Premier and Exalted Order of Malacca (DUNM) with title Datuk Seri Utama
 Grand Master of the Exalted Order of Malacca
Mohd Khalil Yaakob (6th Yang di-Pertua Negeri of Malacca since 4 June 2004) 
 : Grand Master and Grand Commander of the Premier and Exalted Order of Malacca (DUNM) with title Datuk Seri Utama
 Grand Master of the Exalted Order of Malacca
Zurina Binti Kassim, his wife 
 Grand Commander of the Premier and Exalted Order of Malacca (DUNM) with title Datuk Seri Utama

Malaysia, sultanates and states

Malaysia 

late Syed Ahmad Syed Mahmud Shahabuddin (5th Yang di-Pertua Negeri of Malacca 4 December 1984 – 3 June 2004) :
  first Companion (JMN), later Grand Commander Order of the Defender of the Realm (SMN) with title Tun
Order of Loyalty to the Crown of Malaysia : first  Commander (PSM) with title Tan Sri, later  Grand Commander (SSM) with title Tun
Mohd Khalil Yaakob (6th Yang di-Pertua Negeri of Malacca since 4 June 2004) :
 Grand Commander of the Order of the Defender of the Realm  (SMN) with title Tun
Order of Loyalty to the Crown of Malaysia : first  Companion (JSM), later  Commander (PSM) with title Tan Sri

Sultanate of Kedah 

late Syed Ahmad Syed Mahmud Shahabuddin (5th Yang di-Pertua Negeri of Malacca 4 December 1984 – 3 June 2004) :
 Knight Grand Commander of the Exalted Order of the Crown of Kedah (SPMK) with title Dato' Seri
 Knight Grand Companion of the Order of Loyalty to the Royal House of Kedah (SSDK) with title Dato' Seri
Jaksa Pendamai (J.P) of Kedah.

Sultanate of Kelantan 

Mohd Khalil Yaakob (6th Yang di-Pertua Negeri of Malacca since 4 June 2004) :
 Knight Grand Commander of the Order of the Life of the Crown of Kelantan  or "Star of Ismail" (SJMK) with title Dato' Sri

Sultanate of Pahang 

Mohd Khalil Yaakob (6th Yang di-Pertua Negeri of Malacca since 4 June 2004) :
Order of Sultan Ahmad Shah of Pahang : first  Knight Companion (DSAP), later  Grand Knight (SSAP) with title Datuk Sri
Order of the Crown of Pahang  : first  Companion (SMP), later  Grand Knight (or Datuk Sri) (SIMP)
Zurina Binti Kassim, his wife 
 Grand Knight (or Datuk Sri) of the Order of the Crown of Pahang (SIMP) with title Datuk Sri

Sultanate of Selangor 

late Syed Ahmad Syed Mahmud Shahabuddin (5th Yang di-Pertua Negeri of Malacca 4 December 1984 – 3 June 2004) :
 Knight Grand Commander of the Order of the Crown of Selangor (SPMS) with title Dato' Seri

Sultanate of Terengganu 

Mohd Khalil Yaakob (6th Yang di-Pertua Negeri of Malacca since 4 June 2004) :
 Supreme class of the Order of Sultan Mizan Zainal Abidin of Terengganu (SUMZ)

State of Sabah 

late Syed Ahmad Syed Mahmud Shahabuddin (5th Yang di-Pertua Negeri of Malacca 4 December 1984 – 3 June 2004) :
Order of Kinabalu : first  Commander (PGDK) with title Datuk, later  Grand Commander (SPDK) with title Datuk Seri Panglima
Mohd Khalil Yaakob (6th Yang di-Pertua Negeri of Malacca since 4 June 2004) :
 Grand Commander of the Order of Kinabalu (SPDK)  with title Datuk Seri Panglima

State of Sarawak 

Mohd Khalil Yaakob (6th Yang di-Pertua Negeri of Malacca since 4 June 2004) :
 Knight Grand Commander (Datuk Patinggi) of the Order of the Star of Hornbill Sarawak  (DP) with title Datuk Patinggi

Asian honours

Far East  

to be completed if any

Middle East   

to be completed if any

American  honours 

to be completed if any

European honours

Germany 
Mohd Khalil Yaakob (6th Yang di-Pertua Negeri of Malacca since 4 June 2004) :
Grand Cordon Of The Order Of Merit (Germany)

To be completed if any other

African honours 

to be completed if any

References

Notes 

 
Malacca